Rudolf Schmundt (13 August 1896 – 1 October 1944) was a German officer and adjutant to Adolf Hitler. Between 1942 and 1944, he was chief of the German Army Personnel Office. Schmundt was injured during the 20 July 1944 assassination attempt on Hitler and died a few months later from his wounds.

Biography
Schmundt was born in Metz (then in Germany) and served as a lieutenant for the German Army during World War I. In World War II he attained the rank of General of the Infantry on 1 September 1944, and became the Chief of the Personnel Department of the German Army.

Throughout the war, Schmundt was one of Adolf Hitler's many adjutants, and flew with Erwin Rommel in early 1941, just before the Afrika Korps was created.

Schmundt was one of the casualties of the failed 20 July plot, planned to kill the German dictator Adolf Hitler. One of the conspirators, Colonel Claus von Stauffenberg, placed a bomb in a briefcase beside Hitler. Colonel Heinz Brandt moved it behind a heavy table leg and unwittingly saved Hitler's life, but as a consequence, he lost his own. Severely injured in the assassination attempt, Schmundt initially made a promising recovery, but ultimately died of complications resulting from his injuries on 1 October 1944 at the Carlshof hospital.

After Schmundt's death, all current Generals and Field Marshals were summoned by Hitler to attend a funeral service at the Tannenberg Memorial, in east Prussia. As reported by Hauptmann Alexander Stahlberg (aide to Field Marshal Von Manstein) in his book Bounden Duty, the group were entrained back to Berlin and Schmundt was buried, on Hitler's orders, in Invalids' Cemetery. Hitler did not attend either ceremony.

Schmundt was posthumously awarded the German Order on 7 October 1944. He was replaced as the Chief of the Personnel Department by General Wilhelm Burgdorf, the Deputy Chief.

Decorations

 Iron Cross of 1914, 1st and 2nd class
 Honour Cross of the World War 1914/1918
 Wehrmacht Long Service Award
 Golden Party Badge
 German Order (7 October 1944, posthumously)
 Wound Badge of 20 July (posthumously)

References

 Hermann Weiß: Biographisches Lexikon zum Dritten Reich, Frankfurt, 2002, p. 411,.
 Johannes Hürter: Schmundt, Rudolf. In: Neue Deutsche Biographie (NDB). Band 23, Duncker & Humblot, Berlin 2007, p. 267.
 Reinhard Stumpf: General der Infanterie Rudolf Schmundt; in: Gerd R. Ueberschär (Hrsg.): Hitlers militärische Elite. Vom Kriegsbeginn bis zum Weltkriegsende Bd. 2, Primus Verlag, Darmstadt 1998.

1896 births
1944 deaths
Military personnel from Metz
People from Alsace-Lorraine
Prussian Army personnel
Generals of Infantry (Wehrmacht)
Burials at the Invalids' Cemetery
Recipients of the Iron Cross (1914), 1st class
Recipients of the German Order (decoration)
Reichswehr personnel
Adjutants of Adolf Hitler
German Army personnel killed in World War II
20th-century Freikorps personnel
German Army personnel of World War I
German Army generals of World War II